The Gyeongdong Line (慶東線, Keitō-sen) was a  narrow gauge railway line of the Chōsen Railway (Chōtetsu) of colonial-era Korea, in North Gyeongsang Province.

History
In January 1916, the privately owned Chōsen Light Railway began work on a new rail line from Daegu on the Chōsen Government Railway's Gyeongbu Line towards Pohang. The first section,  from Daegu to Hayang, was opened on 1 November 1917. Over the following year, three new sections were opened, with Pohang being reached 364 days after the opening of the first section. On 20 May 1918, a  extension from Hayang to Geumho was opened, followed by the  segment from Geumho to Seoak on 1 September, and the final  stretch to Pohang was opened on 31 October.

Work on a second line began around the same time that the main line was completed, and the first  section, from Gyeongju to Bulguksa, was opened on 14 January 1919. Five months later, on 25 June 1919, a  extension of the main line from Pohang to Haksan was opened, and on 27 September of the same year, the Chōsen Light Railway was renamed Chōsen Central Railway Co. Ltd.

Nothing changed until two years later, when the  line from Bulguksa to Ulsan was completed on 25 October 1921; on 1 November, the Daegu–Haksan line was given the name Gupo Line, and the Gyeongju–Ulsan line was named Ulsan Line. On 1 September 1923, the Chōsen Central Railway merged with five other privately owned railway companies to form the Chōsen Railway, and at the same time, the Gupo Line and the Ulsan Line were merged, collectively being named the Gyeongdong Line.

On 1 July 1928, the Chōsen Government Railway purchased the Gyeongdong Line and renamed it Donghae Jungbu Line.

Services
Initially, only mixed trains, with both passenger and freight cars, operated on the line; in 1922, there was one daily round trip between Daegu and Yeongcheon, four daily round trips between Yeongcheon and Pohang, four between Pohang and Haksan, eight between Seoak and Gyeongju, and three between Gyeongju and Ulsan. Dedicated passenger trains were introduced after the creation of the Chōsen Railway, with a single Daegu–Pohang return service being added to the schedule in 1923, followed by four return services between Daegu and Ulsan in 1926.

Route

References

Rail transport in South Korea
Rail transport in Korea
Korea under Japanese rule
Defunct railway companies of Japan
Defunct railway companies of Korea
Chosen Railway